Oxford City Council is the lower-tier local government authority for the city of Oxford in England, providing such services as leisure centres and parking. Social Services, Education and Highways services (amongst others) are provided by Oxfordshire County Council.

Overview 
Between the 2004 local elections, and 2010 the council was in minority administration, first by councillors from the Labour Party, with the Liberal Democrats being the official opposition. In 2006 these roles were reversed, although two years later the council returned to being run by a minority Labour administration. before they took full control in 2010.  Despite the stereotypical view of Oxford as a conservative city, there are no elected Conservatives on the city council. The Independent Working Class Association was represented for a decade between 2002 and 2012.

Since 2002, elections have been held for Oxford City Council in even years, with each councillor serving a term of four years. Each electoral ward within Oxford is represented by two councillors, thus all wards elect one councillor at each election. Prior to 2002, the City Council was elected by thirds.

In early 2003, the Oxford City Council submitted a bid to become a unitary authority. This was received by the Department for Communities and Local Government but subsequently rejected.

Since 2008, Oxford City Council has been undergoing a programme of Business Transformation which has now been delivered in to the City Council.

Oxford City Council contains all of the Oxford East parliamentary constituency, which was won by Labour in the 2010 General Election with an increased majority but was until then a highly marginal seat with the Liberal Democrats. Labour massively increased its majority following the collapse of the Liberal Democrat vote at the 2015 general election. The Council also covers part of the Oxford West and Abingdon parliamentary constituency, which was won from the Conservatives by the Liberal Democrats at the 2017 General Election.

In 2016, Oxfordshire County Council put forward a 'One Oxfordshire' proposal which would see Oxford City Council and the four other district councils in Oxfordshire abolished and replaced with a single unitary county council for Oxfordshire. In 2017, Oxford City Council voiced their opposition to the proposal and it was subsequently dropped.

In 2018, the electoral ward boundaries were changed due to population shifts in the city. Therefore all 48 councillors will be elected in 2021 (delayed from 2020 due to the COVID-19 pandemic), as opposed to half of them. The system of halves will return from 2022 onwards.

Statistics 

Partisan composition

Partisan control

Councillors

Climate change 
Oxford City Council became the first UK authority to divest from fossil fuel companies in September 2014.

In 2011, Oxford City Council had reduced their carbon footprint by 25% (against a baseline of 2005/6) and continues to reduce carbon emissions from its own estate by 5% year on year.

In 2014, Oxford City Council was named 'Most Sustainable Local Authority' in the Public Sector Sustainability Awards.

Oxford City Council leads the Low Carbon Oxford network –  a collaboration of over 40 organisations working together to reduce emissions in the city by 40% by 2020.

Oxford City Council also leads on delivering the annual Low Carbon Oxford Week festival, which uses culture, creativity and, community to inspire local people to take action on climate change.  In 2015, the festival saw over 60 local organisations partner to deliver over 100 events across the city and attract over 40,000 visitors.

Energy Superhub Oxford
Energy Superhub Oxford is a power optimisation project at the Redbridge park and ride.  It includes a lithium-ion battery of 48MW/50MWh, a vanadium flow battery of 2MW/5MWh, 20 fast electric vehicle chargers for public use and ground-source heat pumps for residential properties.

See also
 Oxford City Council elections
 Oxford Town Hall

References

External links 
 Oxford City Council website

City Council
City Council
Non-metropolitan district councils of England
Billing authorities in England
Local authorities in Oxfordshire